Laurens Paulussen (born 19 July 1990) is a Belgian footballer who currently plays for Lommel in the Belgian First Division B.

External links

1990 births
Living people
Belgian footballers
S.K. Beveren players
K.V.C. Westerlo players
K.V. Mechelen players
Lommel S.K. players
Belgian Pro League players
Challenger Pro League players
Association football defenders
Sportspeople from Turnhout
Footballers from Antwerp Province
21st-century Belgian people